Ryazanovo is a rural locality (a village) in Kolpakovsky Selsoviet Rural Settlement, Kurchatovsky District, Kursk Oblast, Russia. Population:

Geography 
The village is located on the Ralutin River (in the Reut River basin), 47 km south-west of Kursk, 15.5 km south-west of the district center – the town Kurchatov, 6 km from the selsoviet center – Novosergeyevka.

 Climate
Ryazanovo has a warm-summer humid continental climate (Dfb in the Köppen climate classification).

Transport 

The rural locality is situated 54 km from Kursk Vostochny Airport, 119 km from Belgorod International Airport and 253 km from Voronezh Peter the Great Airport.

References

Notes

Sources

Rural localities in Kurchatovsky District, Kursk Oblast